The year 1646 in science and technology involved some significant events.

Technology
 Pascal's Law, a law of hydrostatics is developed, stating that, in a perfect fluid, the pressure exerted on it anywhere is transmitted equally.

Publications
 Dr Thomas Browne's Pseudodoxia Epidemica is published in London, introducing the words electricity, medical, pathology, hallucination and computer to the English language and casting doubt on the theory of spontaneous generation.

Births
 April 20 – Charles Plumier, French botanist (died 1704)
 July 1 – Gottfried Leibniz, German scientist and mathematician (died 1716)

Deaths
 November 29 – Laurentius Paulinus Gothus, Swedish theologian and astronomer (born 1565)

References

 
17th century in science
1640s in science